Squinobal may refer to:

 Arturo Squinobal (b. 1944), Italian mountain climber, mountain guide and ski mountaineer
 Lorenzo "Renzo" Squinobal (b. 1951), Italian mountain climber, mountain guide and ski mountaineer
 Oreste Squinobal (b. 1943), Italian mountain climber, mountain guide and ski mountaineer